The Open Ciudad de Valencia is a tournament for professional female tennis players played on outdoor clay courts. The event is classified as a $80,000+H ITF Women's Circuit tournament and has been held in Valencia, Spain since 2016.

Past finals

Singles

Doubles

External links
  
 ITF search

ITF Women's World Tennis Tour
Recurring sporting events established in 2016
Clay court tennis tournaments
Tennis tournaments in Spain